Rhys Williams (31 December 1897 – 28 May 1969) was a Welsh character actor. He appeared in 78 films over a span of 30 years and later appeared on several American television series.

Career
He made his 1941 film debut in the role of Dai Bando in How Green Was My Valley, a drama about a working-class Welsh family that won the Academy Award for Best Picture. Williams was the only Welsh actor in the cast. He is believed to have been the original narrator of the film, and was originally hired by director John Ford as a dialogue coach.

During television's early years in America, Williams was in scores of series episodes, including the Adventures of Superman as a sadistic character in the 1952 episode "The Evil Three". Williams played art collector Rufus Varner in the 1958 Perry Mason episode, "The Case of the Purple Woman", and appeared on the religion anthology series, Crossroads. His other television work was on such programmes as The Rifleman,  The DuPont Show with June Allyson, Peter Gunn, Riverboat and The Lloyd Bridges Show. His later appearances were on Temple Houston, 77 Sunset Strip, The Wild Wild West, 12 O'Clock High, Bonanza, The F.B.I., Mission: Impossible, Mannix, The Donna Reed Show, Here Come the Brides and The Andy Griffith Show.

Death
Williams died at the age of 71 in Santa Monica, California, on 28 May 1969. His remains are interred at Forest Lawn Memorial Park in Los Angeles.

Filmography

Broadway theatre

Film

Television

References

External links

 
 
 

1897 births
1969 deaths
Welsh male film actors
Welsh male television actors
Welsh male stage actors
Burials at Forest Lawn Memorial Park (Hollywood Hills)
20th-century Welsh male actors
British expatriate male actors in the United States
Male actor filmographies